A scar is a mark left behind after a wound has healed.

Scar(s) may also refer to:

Places
 Scar, Orkney, a village on the island of Sanday, Orkney, Scotland, site of the Scar boat burial
 Scar Ridge, a summit in the White Mountains of New Hampshire, US

Science
 Scar (physics), a fingerprint of quantum chaos
 Meander scar, a geological feature

Arts and entertainment

Fictional characters 
 Scar (Alien vs. Predator), a predator in the 2004 film Alien vs. Predator
 Scar (comics), a villain in the Green Lantern comics series
 Scar (Cylon), a Cylon Raider from the eponymous episode (see below) of Battlestar Galactica
 Scar (Fullmetal Alchemist), a character in the anime/manga series
 Scar (The Lion King), a lion from the film The Lion King
 Scar, leader of the Comanche tribe in the film The Searchers (1956)

Films
 The Scar (1919 film), a lost American silent film
 The Scar (1948 film) or Hollow Triumph, an American film directed by Steve Sekely
 The Scar (1976 film), a Polish film directed by Krzysztof Kieślowski
 Scar (film), a 2007 horror film starring Angela Bettis
 Scars (2006 film), a television docudrama starring Jason Isaacs
 Scars (2020 film), a short documentary film by Alex Anna

Literature 
 Scar literature, a genre of Chinese literature
 The Scar (novel), a 2002 science fiction/fantasy book by China Miéville
 "The Scar", a 1978 story in the scar genre by Lu Xinhua
 Scars, a novel for young adults by Cheryl Rainfield

Music
 Scars (band), a Scottish post-punk band
 Scars, a blues-rock band featuring Gary Moore

Albums
 Scar (Joe Henry album) or the title song, 2001
 Scar (Lush album), 1989
 Scars (Basement Jaxx album) or the title song, 2009
 Scars (Gary Moore album), by the blues-rock band Scars, 2002
 Scars (Soil album), 2001

Songs
 "Scar" (song), by Missy Higgins, 2004
 "Scars" (Allison Iraheta song), 2009
 "Scars" (James Bay song), 2015
 "Scars" (Lukas Graham song), 2020
 "Scars" (Natalie Imbruglia song), 2010
 "Scars" (Papa Roach song), 2005
 "Scars" (Stray Kids song), 2021
 "Scars" (Tove Lo song), 2016
 "Scars" (X Japan song), 1996
 "Scar", by All Saints from Studio 1, 2006
 "Scar", by American Hi-Fi from American Hi-Fi, 2001
 "Scar", by Foxes from All I Need, 2016
 "Scars", by Drake Jensen, 2012
 "Scars", by I Prevail from Lifelines, 2016
 "Scars", by Medina from Forever, 2012
 "Scars", by Miley Cyrus from Can't Be Tamed, 2010
 "Scars", by Rush from Presto, 1989
 "Scars", by Sam Smith from The Thrill of It All, 2017
 "Scars", by tobyMac from The Elements, 2018
 "Scars", by Vanilla Ice from Hard to Swallow, 1998
 "Scars", by Will Young from Lexicon, 2019
 "Scars", by Baby Keem from The Melodic Blue, 2021

Television episodes
 "Scar" (Battlestar Galactica)
 "The Scar" (Fullmetal Alchemist)
 "Scars" (Agents of S.H.I.E.L.D.)
 "Scars" (The Dead Zone)
 "Scars" (The Walking Dead)

See also
 SCAR (disambiguation)
 Scarface (disambiguation)
 Scarred (disambiguation)
 SCARS (disambiguation)
 Skar (disambiguation)
 Henry Scarr, an English shipbuilding company